The Drama Desk Award for Outstanding Scenic Design of a Play is an annual award presented by Drama Desk in recognition of achievements in the theatre among Broadway, Off Broadway and Off-Off Broadway productions. The award was first given in the 1996 ceremony, when the Drama Desk Award for Outstanding Set Design was separated into two categories: one for plays and one for musicals. The award was retired after the 2009 ceremony but revived in the 2016 ceremony.

Winners and nominees

1990s

2000s

2010s

2020s

See also
 Laurence Olivier Award for Best Set Design
 Tony Award for Best Scenic Design

References

External links
 Drama Desk official website

Set Design